Bangued, officially the Municipality of Bangued, is a 1st class municipality and capital of the province of Abra, Philippines. According to the 2020 census, it has a population of 50,382 people.

Etymology

The name Bangued evolved from the Ilocano word "Bangen," which means roadblock, anything that discourages. The Spanish spelled it as "bangued." The "D" was substituted for the nasal sound of "H." When the Americans came the pronunciation was changed to "bangued." To discourage raids in the settlement at Bangued, which is usually situated from Pantoc (now called Penarrubia), "bangen" were placed at the roads leading to the town.

The Tingguians prevented the Spanish forces from penetrating their area of which they placed roadblocks on all roads leading to the place. They also cut large logs and threw them to the Abra River to prevent the incoming Spanish colonist and Ilocano settlers from entering the area with the use of their boats and bamboo rafts. When the logs reached Nagtalabungan the strength of the currents allowed many of these trees to be left behind for the strong current gets narrower as it bends westwards on its course to the South China Sea across a gap in the Ilocos range, better known as "Banaoang." These logs were also made as obstacles and big rocks were placed along the roads which the natives called "bangen."

History

Pre-colonial period

The early settlers were the Tingguians belonging to the Bago, Itneg, Masadiit, lbanao, and Indayas tribes who later intermarried with the immigrants from Ilocos Sur. The Tingguians opposed the Christianization introduced by the Spanish friars who penetrated the eastern settlements.

Spanish era

In 1598, Augustinian fathers Martin and Minon were able to penetrate the valley and found a "mission" in Bangued. A Spanish military garrison was also established to protect the inhabitants from the attacks of the head hunters.

In November 1601, Fray Esteban Marín in the company of an expedition under Captain Mateo de Aranda arrived in Abra but was killed, with his body tied up to a tree, shot by arrows, before being dismembered.

In 1614, Fr. Juan de Pareja, "Conquistador Espiritual" of Abra, arrived with the protection of the Spanish garrison and advanced further to the interior. In 1615, Fr. Juan Pareja organized Bangued as a mission center and baptized 3,000 Tingguians with the help of their chief, Manuel Dumawal.

On April 5, 1617, Bangued was created into a ministry by the Augustinians and Fr. Pedro Columbo was the first minister. Bangued was made an independent mission territory in 1692.

The construction of the big church in Bangued began in 1722 and was completed in 1807. It was about 73 meters long. A spacious convento was built adjoining it. It later became the Sacred Heart of Jesus Academy, which is now the Holy Spirit Academy, a convent for sisters and a school for girls and boys.

On July 25, 1861, the Feast of St. James the Great (Apo Senor Santiago), the town was formally inaugurated.

In August 1898, Fr. Inocencio Vega was the last Spanish missionary to work in Bangued.

American period

When the Americans colonized the country and established the civil government, the town's name was modified to "Bangued".

World War II

On March 10, 1945, at 3:00 P.M., some American planes guided by Filipinos dropped incendiary bombs on the capitol, the catholic church and adjoining buildings. On subsequent days the whole town was bombed. Whoever the bombers saw, they machine-gunned and the whole town as in flames and ruins. Many were burned and whoever could escape fled to the barrios.

Cityhood

Cityhood for Bangued is being given a push in the 16th Congress. Abra Representative Ma. Jocelyn Bernos filed a resolution seeking congressional nod for the capital town's cityhood.

Geography
It is elongated in shape towards the north and south, and bisected through the center by the large Abra River. It is situated in the western portion of the province with boundaries defined by the Province of Ilocos Norte and the Municipality of Danglas in the north; La Paz, Tayum and Peñarrubia in the east; San Isidro in the south, and Langiden and Pidigan in the west.

According to the Philippine Statistics Authority, the municipality has a land area of  constituting  of the  total area of Abra. The town is generally mountainous from north to south; however, it is flat and rolling at the midsection. One such hill is Cassamata Hill which was declared a national park.

Bangued is accessible through the Abra-Ilocos Sur National Road from the west, Abra-Kalinga Road from the north-east, and Abra-Ilocos Norte Road from the North.

Climate

The climate falls under the first type of tropical climate, which is characterized by two pronounced seasons, dry from November to April and wet during the remaining months of the year. Prevailing wind blowing in the area is mostly in the direction from north-west to southeast. However, during summer in the absence of weather disturbance, wind blows from north to south or east to west.

Barangays
Bangued is politically subdivided into 31 barangays with 77 sitios. These barangays are headed by elected officials: Barangay Captain, Barangay Council, whose members are called Barangay Councilors. All are elected every three years.

Demographics

In the 2020 census, Bangued had a population of 50,382.

Economy

The economy of the municipality is heavily dependent on agriculture particularly palay and corn, followed by trade and industry. Chinese businessmen dominate trade and manufacturing as a common preoccupation of the populace.

The commercial activity of Bangued is confined in the urban core establishing a linear pattern of development along major thoroughfares. This is evident from Torrijos Street to Taft Street of Zone 5, McKinley Street to Santiago Street and Partelo Street of Zone 4, and Capitulacion Street of Zone 1 and Zone 2.

For the year 2000 there were 1,539 commercial/business enterprises classified as wholesale and retail trade, dry and wet markets, banking and finance, service and others. There were 9 large suppliers of lumber, hardware and other construction supplies and materials.  Likewise there were also about 3 large contractors with undetermined number of small to medium scale. On the other hand, there were also a number of large to medium scale suppliers of general merchandise, groceries and various types of prime commodities.

As the economic center of Abra, small scale or cottage industries abound. The most common are hollow blocks and other concrete products manufacturing with gravel and sand readily available at the Abra River bank. Wood and bamboo craft are also promising business enterprises with raw materials available in the vicinity and in the hinterlands for narra and other species of hardwood, rattan, and bamboos. Metalcraft, tinsmithing, jewelry making is also expanding while a lot of households are now in the small scale processing or value adding activities appertaining to various food items.

Government
Bangued, belonging to the lone congressional district of the province of Abra, is governed by a mayor designated as its local chief executive and by a municipal council as its legislative body in accordance with the Local Government Code. The mayor, vice mayor, and the councilors are elected directly by the people through an election which is being held every three years.

Elected officials

Healthcare

 Valera Medical Hospital (formerly known as Saint James Clinic), Zone 7 — Private
 Bangued Christian Hospital, Lorben's Hill, Torrijos St., Zone 5 — Private
 Assumpta Hospital, Zone 7 - Private 
 Abra Provincial Hospital, Barangay Calaba — Public
 Seares Memorial Clinic, Zone 4 — Private
 Saint Jude Clinic, Zone 7 — Private
 Bobila Clinic, Zone 7 — Private

Education

The municipality has a total of 24 Educational Institutions at all levels. 21 belong to the government while the rest are private. Of the total public schools, 19 belongs to the elementary levels. Most of the educational institutions of higher levels secondary and tertiary are concentrated in the urban core, while elementary schools are strategically located in different barangays forming their own catchment areas.

Aside from these institutions there are at least 15 daycare centers located in different barangays, and 5 private institutions for pre-schoolers complementing that from the government.

The total number of elementary school teachers in the public sector is 218 giving a gross teacher pupil ratio of 1:30 (SY 1999-2000 DepEd), in the private there are 193 with a ratio of 1:28 in the same period. Two public libraries complement existing facilities, the Provincial Library located al Santiago St. Zone 3 and the Integrated Bar of the Philippines Library located at the Municipal Trial Court.

Colleges
 Divine Word College of Bangued, Zone 6 — Private
 Abra Valley Colleges, Zone 4 — Semi-private
 Data Center College of the Phils., Lipcan,Ubbog
Private
 Abra State Institute of Sciences and Technology, Zone 3 — Public

High schools

 Divine Word College of Bangued, Zone 6 — Private
 Abra Valley Colleges, Zone 4 — Private
 Holy Spirit Academy of Bangued, Zone 5 — Private;
 Abra State Institute of Sciences and Technology, Zone 3 — Public
 Abra High School, Zone 3 — Public
 Saint Joseph Seminary
 Sacred Heart School of Bangued, Zone 6 — Private

Transportation
Passenger buses, mini-buses, jeepneys and tricycles including cargo are the major means of transportation in the town. Buses, mini-buses and jeepneys ply the longer routes covering the entire province of Abra and out, while tricycles serve only the inner arteries of the municipality's barangays including the adjacent towns of Pidigan, Tayum and Peñarrubia on a chartered ride basis.

Buses going to Manila have their own permanent station/terminal, while all the rest are accommodated and parked along various open lots, gasoline stations, etc.

There are jeeps that ply from Bangued to Narvacan.

GMW trans have daily trips to Tuguegarao and Santiago City.

Notable Personalities
 Kurt Barbosa – SEA Games gold medallist, Taekwondo
 Pura Sumangil – community activist

Sister cities
 Vigan

References

External links

 
 [ Philippine Standard Geographic Code]

Municipalities of Abra (province)
Provincial capitals of the Philippines
Populated places on the Abra River